Webconverger is a Linux-based operating system designed solely for accessing Web applications privately and securely. Based on the Debian distro, it is able to boot live from removable media like CD-ROM or USB flash drive but can also be installed to a local hard drive. Webconverger is pre-compiled to run on any x86 hardware. It does not have high system requirements and will also run on older machines.

Webconverger is typically used in Web kiosk and digital signage deployments. It runs the Firefox web browser with a customised window manager dwm and a Firefox add-on also named Webconverger that locks the browser to a simple kiosk operation mode. The browser is locked down with most menus, toolbars, key commands and context menus disabled. Webconverger contains Adobe Flash support and PDF viewing by default. Both wired and wireless networks are supported via DHCP.

Webconverger does binary package updates through git hosted on GitHub.  This is unique to Webconverger as most other distributions use separate package management utilities.
Although being developed in Singapore, it is mainly used commercially in Europe.

Reception 
LWN.net reviewed Webconverger 12 in April 2012 with following words:

Softpedia Linux also have a review of Webconverger 35.1:

See also 
 Kiosk software

References

External links 
 
 

Debian-based distributions
Information appliances
Diskless workstations
End-user lockdowns
Content-control software
Operating system distributions bootable from read-only media
Linux distributions